The 1997 Pokka Suzuka 1000km was the seventh race of the 1997 FIA GT Championship season.  It was run at the Suzuka Circuit, Japan on August 24, 1997.

Several Japanese teams chose to participate in this race, conforming to either the GT1 and GT2 classes.

Official results
Class winners in bold.  Cars failing to complete 75% of winner's distance marked as Not Classified (NC).

‡ – Did not score points due to not being entered in that car

Statistics
 Pole Position – #12 AMG-Mercedes – 1:56.023
 Fastest Lap – #12 AMG-Mercedes – 2:00.019
 Average Speed – 167.340 km/h

External links
 World Sports Prototype Racing – Race Results

S
Suzuka 1000